Lissotesta radiata is a species of sea snail, a marine gastropod mollusk, unassigned in the superfamily Seguenzioidea.

Distribution
This marine species occurs in the Great Barrier Reef, Australia.

References

External links
 To World Register of Marine Species

radiata
Gastropods described in 1907